The Clywedog Trail is a  footpath close to Wrexham in Wales.  Starting at the Minera Lead Mines  and running to King's Mills  it follows the course of the River Clywedog. It is a haven for walking, relaxation and enjoying the peace of the wildlife. It is said that the Clywedog Valley was the Silicon Valley of the 18th century, as it was there that British ironmaking began in 1670, smelting iron ore with coke began in 1721 and John Wilkinson set up shop in 1761. For many years the area was one of the most important iron manufacturing centres in the world.

Sights
Sights passed include:

Minera Lead Mines
Nant Mill
Plas Power Church
Offa's Dyke and Plas Power Woods
Bersham Ironworks
Bersham
Erddig
King's Mills

External links

 Trail info on Wrexham Borough Council website

Wrexham
Recreational walks in Wales
Tourist attractions in Wrexham County Borough